Zbyněk is a Czech masculine given name. The Polish equivalent is Zbigniew.

Notable people with the name include:
Zbyněk Zajíc (1376–1411), Czech nobleman
Zbyněk Berka z Dubé (1551–1606), Catholic Cleric, cardinal, the tenth Archbishop of Prague
Zbyněk Brynych (1927–1995), Czech film director and screenwriter
Zbyněk Busta (born 1967), Czech football manager
Zbyněk Drda (born 1987), Czech singer
Zbyněk Fiala (born 1964), Czech cyclist
Zbyněk Hampl (born 1988), Czech ice hockey player
Zbyněk Hauzr (born 1973), Czech football goalkeeper
Zbyněk Hejda (born 1930), Czech poet, essayist and translator
Zbyněk Hráček (born 1970), Czech International Grandmaster of chess
Zbyněk Hrdel (born 1985), Czech ice hockey player
Zbyněk Hubač (born 1940), Czechoslovak ski jumper
Zbyněk Irgl (born 1980), Czech professional ice hockey player
Zbyněk Krompolc (born 1978), Czech ski jumper
Zbyněk Mařák (born 1971), Czech professional ice hockey player
Zbyněk Michálek (born 1982), Czech professional ice hockey player
Zbyněk Mlynařík (born 1977), Czech–Austrian tennis player
Zbyněk Musiol, Czech footballer
Zbyněk Novák (born 1983), Czech ice hockey player
Zbyněk Ollender (born 1966), Czech professional football player
Zbyněk Pánek (born 1972), Czech Nordic combined skier
Zbyněk Pospěch (born 1982), Czech football forward
Zbyněk Puleč (born 1948), Czech canoeist
Zbyněk Šidák (1933–1999), Czech mathematician
Zbyněk Stanjura (born 1964), Czech politician
Zbyněk Zbyslav Stránský (1926–2016), Czech museologist
Zbyněk Vostřák (1920–1985), Czech composer 
Zbyněk Žába (1917–1971), Czechoslovak Egyptologist
Zbyněk Zeman (1928–2011), Czech historian

See also

References

Czech masculine given names

fr:Zbignev